1296 Andrée, provisional designation , is a stony Nysian asteroid from the inner regions of the asteroid belt, approximately 25 kilometers in diameter. It was discovered on 25 November 1933, by French astronomer Louis Boyer at the North African Algiers Observatory, Algeria, and named after the discoverer's niece.

Orbit and classification 

Andrée is a member of the Nysa family, named after its namesake 44 Nysa and one of the smaller asteroid families in the main-belt. It orbits the Sun at a distance of 2.1–2.8 AU once every 3 years and 9 months (1,373 days). Its orbit has an eccentricity of 0.14 and an inclination of 4° with respect to the ecliptic.

Lightcurves 

In January 2002, a rotational lightcurve of Andrée was obtained from photometric observations by French amateur astronomer Laurent Bernasconi. Lightcurve analysis gave a well-defined rotation period of 5.178 hours with a brightness variation of 0.27 magnitude. In October 2004, a concurring lightcurve with a period of 5.18366 hours and an amplitude of 0.23 was obtained by French astronomers Cyril Cavadore and Pierre Antonini.

Diameter and albedo 

According to the surveys carried out by the Infrared Astronomical Satellite IRAS, the Japanese Akari satellite, and NASA's Wide-field Infrared Survey Explorer with its subsequent NEOWISE mission, Andrée measures between 20.66 and 28.045 kilometers in diameter, and its surface has an albedo of between 0.06 and 0.121. The Collaborative Asteroid Lightcurve Link derives an albedo of 0.0849 and a diameter of 25.07 kilometers with an absolute magnitude of 11.3.

Naming 

This minor planet was named by the discoverer in honor of his niece, Andrée. Naming citation was first published by Paul Herget in The Names of the Minor Planets in 1955.

References

External links 
 Asteroid Lightcurve Database (LCDB), query form (info )
 Dictionary of Minor Planet Names, Google books
 Asteroids and comets rotation curves, CdR – Observatoire de Genève, Raoul Behrend
 Discovery Circumstances: Numbered Minor Planets (1)-(5000) – Minor Planet Center
 (1296) Andree at AstDyS, University of Pisa
 
 

001296
Discoveries by Louis Boyer (astronomer)
Named minor planets
19331125